Upwardly Mobile was an Irish television sitcom that was made and broadcast by RTÉ. Three series, including three Christmas specials, were originally broadcast on RTÉ One between 8 September 1995 and 26 December 1997.

The programme starred Joe Savino and Catherine Byrne as northside couple Eddie and Molly Keogh, who win the Lotto and move to the exclusive Belvedere Downs estate on the southside of Dublin. Backed by a strong supporting cast, the series chronicles their highs and lows in life, in particular the contrast with their upper-class neighbours.

Broadcast dates

Series

Special

References

External links
 

1995 Irish television series debuts
1997 Irish television series endings
Irish television sitcoms
RTÉ original programming